Blacksburg Historic District is a national historic district located at Blacksburg, Montgomery County, Virginia.  The district encompasses 137 contributing buildings and 2 contributing sites in the central business district and surrounding residential areas of the town of Blacksburg. The district includes commercial, residential, and institutional buildings in a variety of popular architectural styles including Greek Revival, Gothic Revival, and Colonial Revival.  Notable buildings include the Johnson House (c. 1840), Blacksburg Presbyterian Church #1 (1847), Smith-Montgomery House (c. 1825), Croy House, Spout Spring House, Deyerle's Store (1875-1877), W. B. Conway Building, Presbyterian manse (1907), Sheriff Camper House (c. 1910), Christ Episcopal Church (1875-1879, with tower added in 1934 by Ralph Adams Cram), African Methodist Episcopal Church of Blacksburg, Blacksburg Presbyterian Church (1904), Blacksburg Methodist Church (1910), St. Mary's Catholic Church, Hunter's Lodge Masonic Building (1928), Martin-Logan Store (c. 1925), Lyric Theater (1922), and Ellett's Drug Store (1900).

It was listed on the National Register of Historic Places in 1991.

Gallery

References

Historic districts in Montgomery County, Virginia
Greek Revival architecture in Virginia
Gothic Revival architecture in Virginia
Colonial Revival architecture in Virginia
National Register of Historic Places in Montgomery County, Virginia
Buildings and structures in Blacksburg, Virginia
Historic districts on the National Register of Historic Places in Virginia